HD 210056, also known as HR 8432, is a solitary orange hued star located in the southern circumpolar constellation Octans. Eggen (1993) listed it as a member of the old disk population.

The object has an apparent magnitude of 6.13, making it barely visible to the naked eye. Based on parallax measurements from the Gaia satellite, the object is estimated to be 292 light years distant. At its current distance, HD 210056's brightness is diminished by 0.2 magnitudes due to interstellar dust. It has an absolute magnitude of +1.41.

This is an evolved giant star with a stellar classification of K0 III. It has 1.59 times the mass of the Sun but has expanded to 7.72 times its girth. Based on asteroseismologic measurements, HD 210056 is estimated to be 2 billion years old. The star has about 90% of the Sun's metallicity — what astronomers define a star's abundance of chemical elements heavier than helium.

References

K-type giants
High-proper-motion stars
Octans
Octantis, 68
CD-76 01120
210056
109584
8432